Extralife is the third studio album by the American Folk band Darlingside. It was released on February 23, 2018, by More Doug Records and Thirty Tigers.

Release
On February 7, 2018, the band announced the release of their third studio album, along with the single "Futures". The music video for the single, which was directed by Keith Boynton, features a time traveler's attempt to reset the balance of the world. Darlingside's lead vocalist Don Mitchell explained the single: "'Futures,' to me, is about taking our collective dread for what's to come and turning what could be a helpless feeling into a call to action, however insignificant that action might feel at the time,"

Critical reception

Extralife was met with "universal acclaim" reviews from critics. At Metacritic, which assigns a weighted average rating out of 100 to reviews from mainstream publications, this release received an average score of 81 based on 7 reviews. Aggregator Album of the Year gave the release a 82 out of 100 based on a critical consensus of 5 reviews.

James Christopher Monger of AllMusic gave the album four out of five stars, explaining: "A refreshingly optimistic take on the early 21st century's obsession with dystopian themes, the 12-track set deals with social, political, and environmental complications with measured grace and some truly dexterous arrangements. Extralife imagines a future that's not bereft of suffering or hardship, but tempered with hope and brimming with life." Hal Horowitz from American Songwriter gave the release three-and-a-half out of five, explaining: "Softly strummed guitars, cello, violin, bass and even the occasional synthesizer provide the predominantly acoustic musical backing to honeyed, moving and impeccably crafted tunes that seem to be delivered from the heavens." Writing for The Austin Chronicle, Rachel Rascoe noted the band's third studio album is "a lovely sunrise eulogy to modern uncertainty", while explaining "the Boston foursome's anxiously blissful take on apocalyptic concerns bends toward chamber pop after past Americana leanings, the 12 tracks grounded in plucky instrumentation and energetic harmony."

Track listing

Charts

Personnel

Band Members
 Don Mitchell – lead vocals, guitar
 Harris Paseltiner – guitar, vocals
 David Senft – bass, drums
 Auyon Mukharji – violin, vocals
Additional Musicians
 Ariel Bernstein – percussion
 Alec Spiegelman – flute
 Jonathan Dely – trumpet
 Caitlin Canty – backing vocals

Production
 Peter Bradley Adams – engineer
 Jeff Lipton – mastering
 Dan Cardinal – engineer, mixing, producer

References

Darlingside albums
2018 albums